Garbo is a 1992 Australian comedy film directed by Ron Cobb. It was written by the Australian comedians Neill Gladwin and Steve Kearney with Patrick Cook from a story by Hugh Rule.  Max Cullen, Moya O'Sullivan and Imogen Annesley also star. Filmed in Melbourne, the story focuses on two Australian garbagemen (garbos in Australian slang) who have to compete with a new corporate outfit which also has ambitions to redevelop parts of the suburb in which they work. The film's engagement with the simpler pleasures of community life reflects the work of Jacques Tati, who both Gladwin and Kearney admired.

Cast 
Steve Kearney as Steve
Neill Gladwyn as Neill
Max Cullen as Wal
Moya O'Sullivan as Freda
Imogen Annesley as Jane
Gerard Kennedy as Trevor
Tommy Dysart as Bagpipes
Max Fairchild as Big Feral
Roderick Williams as Pope
David Glazebrook as Fragile
Earl Francis as Control Tower Garbo
Ray Chubb as Garbo Foreman
Simon Chilvers as Detective

Music
The Celtic punk band The Pogues recorded a song, "In and Out," for the film's soundtrack. Kate Ceberano and Yothu Yindi also contributed music for the film. Ceberano and her band recorded a version of Wa Wa Nee's song "I Want You" and can be seen performing the song in a club scene.

Reception
The film was much anticipated, but poorly received. While recognising that Los Trios Ringbarkus were 'astonishingly successful' within the '"stumbling dills" school of comedy', Jim Schembri wrote of Garbo that:

The film is incredibly pretentious, which may be a ridiculous charge to level at a film as lame-brained as this, but something must be said when pseudo-radical Lefty cliches get bandied around. The film makes these Left-wing platitudes about the evils of big business and how technology encroaches on jobs for humans... Yet the role of Jane (Imogen Annesley), Neill's love interest, is insultingly sexist. Jane is supposed to be an intellectual, yet she has absolutely no emotional range or depth... Director Rob Cobb missed the boat with this. A designer of enormous talent, an artist and cartoonist of great wit and perception, he has misfired in a major way. Surely someone with great visual flair should have at least made the film look interesting. The only contribution Cobb appears to have made is in the design of a garbage truck.

See also 
Los Trios Ringbarkus

References

External links 

Garbo at Screen Australia
Garbo at Oz Movies

1992 films
Australian comedy films
1992 comedy films
Cultural depictions of Greta Garbo
Films shot in Australia
Films set in Australia
1990s English-language films